Major General Sir Charles Armand Powlett, KB (c. 1694 – 14 November 1751), of Leadwell (now Ledwell), Oxfordshire, was a British Army officer and Whig politician who sat in the House of Commons between 1729 and 1751.

Powlett was the younger son of Lord William Powlett, brother of the second Duke of Bolton, by his wife Louisa, daughter of Armand Nompar de Caumont, Marquis de Montpouillon, and granddaughter of Henri Nompar de Caumont, 3rd Duc de La Force. He joined the Army, rising to the rank of Lieutenant-Colonel and was appointed Lieutenant-Governor of the Isle of Wight from 1733 to his death.

At the 1734 British general election he was defeated at St Ives. He was returned as MP for Christchurch   at a by election on 3 April 1740, and on 27 December of that year he became Colonel of a newly raised regiment of Marines, which took his name and was later ranked as the 52nd Regiment of Foot. He was returned unopposed for Christchurch in 1741 and 1747. His regiment was disbanded on 7 November 1748. On 2 May 1749 Powlett was made a Knight Companion of the Order of the Bath, and on 1 November he was appointed Colonel of what had been George Reade's Regiment, later the 9th Regiment of Foot. On 26 January 1751 he became Colonel of the 13th Dragoons, a post he held until his death later that year. His second cousin once removed, Captain Harry Powlett, was elected for Christchurch in his place.

In June 1738 he had married Elizabeth, daughter of Thomas Lewes of Stanford in Nottinghamshire and widow of Richard Dashwood, third son of Sir Robert Dashwood, 1st Baronet and a former High Sheriff of Norfolk; they had no children. Sir Charles Powlett was survived by Lady Powlett, who died in September 1756, by his stepson Robert Dashwood, and by his step-grandson Charles Vere Dashwood, of Stanford, who was later to name his eldest son Charles Armand Dashwood.

References

1694 births
1751 deaths
13th Hussars officers
British Army generals
British MPs 1727–1734
British MPs 1734–1741
British MPs 1741–1747
British MPs 1747–1754
Knights Companion of the Order of the Bath
Members of Parliament for the Isle of Wight
Royal Norfolk Regiment officers
Charles